Heinz Gappmayr (7 October 1925, in Innsbruck – 20 April 2010, in Innsbruck) was an Austrian artist who created works of visual poetry.

Publications
 auswahl. Mit einem Nachwort von Markus Klammer. Folio Verlag, Wien, Bozen 2009. .
 mit Werner Herbst: Echo. 21 Blätter in Kassette, Herbstpresse, Wien 2003.
 mit Siegfried S. Schmidt, Franzobel: Josef Linschinger. Zyklen / Cycles. Kunstuniversität Linz, Ritter Verlag, Klagenfurt 2003, .

Literature
 Dorothea van der Koelen: Opus Heinz Gappmayr. Werkverzeichnis der visuellen und theoretischen Texte, Band 1: 1961–1990. van der Koelen Verlag, Mainz 1990, 
 Dorothea van der Koelen: Das Werk Heinz Gappmayrs. Darstellung und Analyse. Lit-Verlag, Münster 1994.
 Dorothea van der Koelen: Opus Heinz Gappmayr. Werkverzeichnis der visuellen und theoretischen Texte 1991–1996. Chorus-Verlag, Mainz/München 1997, 
 Dorothea van der Koelen: Heinz Gappmayr. Wort – Zahl – Zeichen, monographischer Beitrag für »Künstler«. Kritisches Lexikon der Gegenwartskunst, Weltkunst und Bruckmann-Verlag, München 1999
 Dorothea van der Koelen: Opus Heinz Gappmayr. Werkverzeichnis der visuellen und theoretischen Texte, Band 3: 1997–2004.'' Chorus-Verlag, Mainz 2005,

References

External links
Catalogue of the German National Library
Obituary

1925 births
2010 deaths
Austrian artists